Mohammed Umar Mukri (5 January 1922 – 4 September 2000), popularly known as Mukri, was an Indian actor, who worked as a comedian in Hindi films.

Born as Muhammad Umar Mukri in Uran, in Kokani Muslim Family. He started his film career with the film Pratima along with noted film actor Dilip Kumar in 1945. They were schoolmates together in the past. Subsequently, in career spanning 50 years, he acted in over 600 films.

Mukri, with his toothless smile, diminutive stature and perfect comic timing amused the audiences in more than 600 films, in over six decades in Indian cinema.

His notable films are Mother India (1957), Sharabi (1984), Amar Akbar Anthony (1977), Laawaris (1981), Bombay to Goa (1972), Gopi (1970), Kohinoor (1960) and many more.

Career
His career in films ran parallel to that of Dilip Kumar, who was his schoolmate. They made their debut with the Bombay Talkies film Pratima, also the directorial debut of actor P. Jairaj. Before joining the film industry, Mukri worked as a Qazi.

Death and legacy
Mukri died in Mumbai on 4 September 2000 at the age of 78, at Lilavati Hospital due to a heart attack and kidney failure. His lifelong friend and schoolmate actor Dilip Kumar and his wife Saira Banu were present by his deathbed. Actor Sunil Dutt had also been occasionally visiting Mukri in the hospital. Mukri's oldest daughter Naseem Mukri was also there and made arrangements for her father's funeral.

Johnny Walker who worked with Mukri in at least 15 films, recalled, "He had this great pairing with Sheikh Mukhtar – one was very tall and one very short – they looked very good together and made a fine pair. They were known as Laurel and Hardy."

Personal life
Mukri and his wife Mumtaz had 5 children; 2 daughters Naseem and Amina and three sons Nasir, Farooque and Bilal. One of his daughters, Naseem Mukri who wrote dialogues of movies Dhadkan and Haan Maine Bhi Pyaar Kiya. She wrote the screenplay of Dhadkan and acted in it too.
His daughter, Naseem Mukri, had reportedly told the news media, "Abba was extremely religious. He also was a keen horserace enthusiast, even owned a couple. Every Sunday would see him at the races."

Filmography

 Betaaj Badshah (1994) as College Principal
Dushman Zamana (1992) as Mickey Seth, Garage Owner
 Yeh Aag Kab Bujhegi (1991) as House Servant
 Trinetra (1991) as Wrestler Show Organizer
 Izzatdaar (1990)
 Jaadugar (1989) as Nathulal
 Daata (1989) as Pandit Ram Prasad
 Gair Kaanooni (1989) as Chinnappa Malappa Shetty
 Mohabat Ka Paigham (1989)
 Ram Lakhan (1989) as Dhondu Nai
 Agnee (1988) as Santosh Sen
 Ganga Tere Desh Mein (1988) as Inmate
 Bhatakti Jawani (1988)
 Gangaa Jamunaa Saraswathi (1988) (uncredited) as Master of the house of newlyweds
 Kaash (1987) as Municipal Dog Catcher
 Hawalaat (1987) as Director (guest appearance)
 Imaandaar (1987) as Nathulal
 Parivaar (1987) as  Banwari
Ek Aur Sikander as Chacha (1986)
 Karma (1986) as Chhote Khan
 Amrit (1986) as Kamru
 Babu (1985) as Constable
 Hum Dono (1985) as Popley
 Naya Bakra (1985) as Boy
 Jhutha Sach (1984) as  Politician (song "Loot Gayi")
 Meraa Dost Meraa Dushman (1984) as Harkishen
 Rakta Bandhan (1984) as Dharamdas
 Sharaabi (1984) as Natthulal
 Coolie (1983) as Mr. Iyengar
 Mahaan (1983) as Guru's foster father
 Sun Meri Laila (1983) as Ad Film Director
 Daulat Ke Dushman (1983) as Soni
 Anokha Bandhan (1982) as Kalu Mali (Gardener)
 Vidhaata (1982) as Dance Organiser
 Sun Sajna (1982)
 Dharam Kanta (1982) as Shiva's stepfather
 Khud-Daar (1982) as 
Tailor Master
 Khoon Ka Rishta (1981)
 Sannata (1981)
 Lawaaris (1981) as Gaffoor Bhai
 Khoon Aur Paani (1981) as Saramji Rustomji Bochwala – man with newspaper
 Ladies Tailor (1981) (as Muqri) as Kaniz's Drummer
 Naseeb (1981) as Mehboob Bhai
 Katilon Ke Kaatil (1981)
 Umrao Jaan (1981) (uncredited) as Parnan Aziz
 Karz (1980) as College Principal
 The Burning Train (1980) as Kanhaiya
 Abdullah (1980) as Trader
 Phir Wohi Raat (1980)
 Takkar (1980)
 Yari Dushmani (1980) as Hotel manager
 Aatish (1979) as Diwan Chotelal
 Shikshaa (1979) as Parsi driving classic car
 Sawan Ko Aane Do (1979)
 Sunayana (1979) as Circus owner
 Ganga Ki Saugand (1978) as Guest appearance
 Ankh Ka Tara (1978) as Govind
 Phool Khile Hain Gulshan Gulshan (1978)
 Pandit Aur Pathan (1977) as Parheshan
 Amaanat (1977) as Mr. Lobo
 Amar Akbar Anthony (1977) as Taiyyab Ali
 Chandi Sona (1977) as Chhota
 Saheb Bahadur (1977) as Waiter
 Tyaag (1977) as Mangal Dada
 Fakira(1976) as Chimanlal's Private Secretary
 Sabse Bada Rupaiya (1976) as Phalku
 Arjun Pandit (1976)
 Bairaag (1976) (as Muqri) as Munim
 Jai Bajrang Bali (1976) as Shakun's assistant
 Bundal Baaz (1976) as Gupta
 Aa Jaa Sanam (1975)
 Andhera (1975)
 Mazaaq (1975) as Chunnilal Paan Wala
 Zorro (1975) as Maniram
 Kunwara Baap (1974) as Hawaldar (Constable)
 Naya Din Nai Raat (1974) as Stage Prompter
 Do Phool (1974) as Man who captures Pavitra
 Duniya Ka Mela (1974)
 Loafer (1973) as Bus Boy
 Heera (1973) as Manglu
 Honeymoon (1973) as Ramsingh
 Mehmaan (1973) as Bellboy
 Mere Gharib Nawaz (1973) as Afzal
 Suraj Aur Chanda (1973)
 Bombay to Goa (1972) as South Indian
 Piya Ka Ghar (1972) as Kanhaiya
 Annadata (1972) as Shaadilal
 Anokha Daan (1972)
 Apradh (1972) as German Jewelry Appraiser
 Zindagi Zindagi (1972) as Dr. Sunil's servant
 Hungama (1971) as Broker Talaram
 Rakhwala (1971) (uncredited) as Dr. Panchotiya
 Pyar Ki Kahani (1971) as Member of Banke's party
 Upaasna (1971)
 Albela (1971)
 Ek Nari Ek Brahmachari (1971) as Thakur Chandan Singh
 Johar Mehmood in Hong Kong (1971) as James
 Jwala (1971)
 Lakhon Me Ek (1971) as Makhanlal
 Main Sunder Hoon (1971) as Dattaram
 Paras (1971) as Manager
 Mastana (1970) as Dhanraj's Chauffeur
 Prem Pujari (1970) as Indian Muslim
 Bachpan (1970) as Rahim's dad
 Bhai-Bhai (1970)
 Darpan (1970)
 Devi (1970) as Sunder Das
 Gopi (1970) as Ramlal
 Mera Naam Joker (1970) as Circus Surgeon
 Suhana Safar (1970) as Mukkaramjah Mknaik 'Mukri'
 Do Raaste (1969) as Special Guest
 Bhai Bahen (1969) as Mangu
 Chirag (1969) as Tingu
 Madhavi (1969) as Kaviraj
 Meri Bhabhi (1969)
 Nannha Farishta (1969) as Chaubey
 Yakeen (1969) as Father of the guy who found body at the beach
 Aabroo (1968)
 Anokhi Raat (1968) as Naubat
 Izzat (1968) as Rondhu
 Padosan (1968) as Banarasi
 Raja Aur Runk (1968) as Sunder – Sudhir's friend
 Sadhu Aur Shaitaan (1968) as Krishnamurthy
 Vaasna (1968)
 Anita (1967)
 Chandan Ka Palna (1967) as Munshi Chhote Lal
 Duniya Nachegi (1967)
 Farz (1967) as Raju
 Hamare Gam Se Mat Khelo (1967)
 Meherban (1967) as Nathu aka Moti – Owner of Gadhamaharaj
 Milan (1967) as Jaggu
 Ram Aur Shyam (1967) as Murlidhar
 Suraj (1966) as Anokhe
 Daadi Maa (1966) as Bihari
 Johar in Kashmir (1966) as School-master
 Mera Saaya (1966) as Munshiji (Banke's Friend)
 Smuggler (1966) as Banarsi "Batlitodh"
 Johar-Mehmood in Goa (1965) as Master/Headmaster Pinto
 Bahu Beti (1965) as Kadam
 Himalay Ki Godmein (1965) as Budhimaan
 Nishan (1965)
 Char Dervesh (1964) as Masha Allah
 Phoolon Ki Sej (1964) as Jacket
 Pooja Ke Phool (1964) as Kisaan
 Bahurani (1963)
 Dev Kanya (1963)
 Phool Bane Angarey (1963)
 Aashiq (1962)
 Asli-Naqli (1962) as Nandu
 Man-Mauji (1962) .... Darbari Lal
 Sangeet Samrat Tansen (1962) .... Ustad Fateh Khan
 Son of India (1962)
 Bada Aadmi (1961)
 Anuradha (1960) .... Atmaram
 Bewaqoof (1960) .... Sherdil (Marina's dad)
 Kohinoor (1960)
 Anari (1959) .... Kamdhar (Raj Kapoor's co-worker)
 Barkha (1959) .... Shambu
 Kali Topi Lal Rumal (1959)
 Qaidi No. 911 (1959)
 Aji Bas Shukriya (1958)
 Amar Deep (1958) .... Lali
 Kala Pani (1958) .... Madhosh Miyan
 Malik (1958)
 Sohni Mahiwal (1958)
 Mother India (1957) (as Muqri) .... Shambu
 Suvarna Sundari (1957)
 Aawaz (1956)
 Chori Chori (1956) (as Muqri) .... Madarilal
 Lalten (1956)
 Paisa Hi Paisa (1956)
Kismet Ka Khel (1956)
 Char Paise (1955)
 Inaam (1955)
 Amar (1954 film) (as Muqri) .... Advocate
 Daku Ki Ladki (1954)
 Mangu (1954)
 Mastana (1954)
 Mirza Ghalib (1954)
 Baghi (1953)
 Shahenshah (1953)
 Aan (1952) (as Muqri) .... Chandan
 Annadata (1952)
 Sazaa (1951) .... Batwa
 Jan Pahchan (1950) .... Lallu
 Pardes (1950)
 Anokha Pyar (1948)
 Mera Geet (1946)
 Pratima(1945)

Self:
 Kala Bazar (1960) .... Himself
 Shrimanji (1968) .... Himself
 Gomti Ke Kinare (1972) .... Himself
 Raj Kapoor (1987) .... Himself (during funeral)
 Sar Ankhon Par (1999) .... Himself

Archive Footage:
 Film Hi Film (1983) (uncredited)

References

External links

Male actors in Hindi cinema
1922 births
2000 deaths
Indian male comedians
People from Raigad district
Muslim male comedians
Konkani Muslims
20th-century Indian male actors
20th-century comedians